A String of Pearls is a 1912 American short silent drama film directed by D. W. Griffith and starring Blanche Sweet.

Cast
 Dorothy Bernard - The Poor Woman
 Charles West - The Poor Woman's Brother (as Charles H. West)
 Kate Bruce - The Poor Woman's Mother
 Blanche Sweet - The Second Woman
 William J. Butler - The Second Woman's Father
 Adolph Lestina - The Doctor
 Mack Sennett - The Musician
 Charles Hill Mailes - The Rich Doctor
 Dell Henderson - The Millionaire
 Grace Henderson - The Millionaire's Wife

See also
 D. W. Griffith filmography
 Blanche Sweet filmography

References

External links

1912 films
American silent short films
American black-and-white films
1912 drama films
1912 short films
Films directed by D. W. Griffith
Silent American drama films
1910s American films
American drama short films
1910s English-language films